The Sovremenny class, Soviet designation Project 956 Sarych (buzzard), is a class of anti-ship and anti-aircraft guided-missile destroyers of the Soviet and later Russian Navy. The ships are named after qualities, with "Sovremenny" translating as "modern" or "contemporary". Most of the ships have been retired from active service and one converted into a museum ship in 2018; as of 2021 three remain in commission with the Russian Navy with several in overhaul. Four modified ships were delivered to the People's Liberation Army Navy, and remain in service.
 
The Sovremenny class are guided-missile destroyers, primarily tasked with anti-ship warfare, while also providing sea and air defense for warships and transports under escort. The class was designed to complement the s, which were fitted primarily for anti-submarine operations.

History
 
The project began in the late 1960s when it was becoming obvious in the Soviet Navy that naval guns still had an important role, particularly in support of amphibious landings, but existing gun cruisers and destroyers were showing their age. A new design was started, employing a new 130 mm automatic gun turret. Single and twin mounts were developed, and the twin mount was chosen for its superior rate of fire. In 1971 a go-ahead was given for the Severnaya design bureau to design "a ship capable of supporting amphibious landings". At the same time, the United States Navy was constructing new large  multi-role destroyers. To respond to this new threat, Project 956 was updated with a new air defence suite and new, powerful 3M80 anti-ship missiles. Although the Soviet Navy had largely moved to gas turbine propulsion for its new warships, steam turbines were selected instead for Project 956: partly because production of naval gas turbines would have been insufficient for the entire program. The lead ship of the class, Sovremenny was laid down in 1976 and commissioned in 1980. A total of 17 were built for the Russian Navy, but currently, only six remain in service due to a lack of funds and trained personnel. Additionally, two ships are ongoing modernization and overhaul and two are laid up in reserve (the table lists three in service, two in reserve, one being overhauled, and 11 decommissioned + four Chinese). All the ships were built by Severnaya Verf 190 in St. Petersburg.

These ships have a maximum displacement of 7,940 tons. They are armed with an anti-submarine helicopter, 48 air defence missiles, eight anti-ship missiles, torpedoes, mines, long-range guns and a sophisticated electronic warfare system.

There are a total of three versions of this class: the original Project 956 armed with the 3M80 version of the Moskit anti-ship missile, and its successor, the Project 956A, which is armed with the improved 3M80M version of the Moskit with longer range. The main difference between the two is that the missile launching tubes on Project 956A are longer than that of Project 956 to accommodate the increased size of the newer missile, and these launching tubes can be used to fire/store the original 3M80 as well. A third version, Project 956EM, later developed for the People's Liberation Army Navy Surface Force was the latest development of this class. Chinese media called the ship a "carrier killer".

Design

Command and control
The ship's combat systems can use target designation data from the ship's active and passive sensors, from other ships in the fleet, from surveillance aircraft or via a communications link from the ship's helicopter. The multi-channel defence suite is capable of striking several targets simultaneously.

Missiles

The ship is outfitted with the Raduga Moskit anti-ship missile system with two four-cell launchers installed port and starboard of the forward island and set at an angle of about 15°. The ship carries a total of eight Moskit 3M80E missiles, NATO designation SS-N-22 Sunburn.

Two Shtil surface-to-air missile systems are installed, each on the raised deck behind the twin-barrelled 130 mm guns. Shtil is the export name of the SA-N-7, NATO reporting name Gadfly. (From the 9th ship onwards, the same launcher is used for SA-17 Grizzly/SA-N-12 Yezh.) The system uses the ship's three-dimensional circular scan radar for target tracking. Up to three missiles can be aimed simultaneously. The ship carries 48 Shtil missiles.

Guns

The ship's  guns are the AK-130-MR-184. The system includes a computer control system with electronic and television sighting. The gun can be operated in fully automatic mode from the radar control system, under autonomous control using the turret-mounted Kondensor optical sighting system, and can also be laid manually. The rate of fire is disputed, but various Russian sources credit the weapon with a cyclic rate of 30–40 rounds per minute per barrel, in line with the French Creusot-Loire 100 mm or the Italian OTO Melara 127 mm/54, but faster than the US Mark 45.

The ship has four six-barreled 30 mm AK-630 auto-cannon systems. The maximum rate of fire is 5,000 rounds/min. Range is up to 4,000 m for low flying anti-ship missiles and 5,000 m for light surface targets. The gun is outfitted with radar and television detection and tracking. The latest Sovremennys carry the Kashtan CIWS system instead of AK-630.

Anti-submarine systems

The destroyers have two double  torpedo tubes and two six-barrel RBU-1000 anti-submarine rocket launchers, with 48 rockets. The rocket is armed with a  warhead.

Helicopter
The ship's helicopter pad and telescopic hangar accommodate one Kamov Ka-27 anti-submarine warfare helicopter, NATO codename Helix.

Countermeasures
The Project 956 destroyer is fitted with an electronic countermeasures system and carries a store of 200 rockets for the two decoy dispensers, model PK-2.

Sensors

Radar

The complete sensor suite and ECM comprises: 3D radar 'Top Steer', replaced later with 'Top Plate' (MR-760), 230 km range vs fighters and 50 km vs missiles and a total of 40 targets can be simultaneously tracked; Mineral system ('Band Stand') to allow the SS-N 22 guidance; 3 navigation and surface control radar MR-201 e 212; 2 'Bass Tilt' (MR-123) for CIWS; 6 'Front Dome'(MR-90) radar for SA-N-7 guidance (a very large arrangement to assure an effective defense against saturation attacks), linked with 3D radar and two SAM launcher (5 missile min each); 1 'Kite Screech' radar for 130 mm (MR-184 Lev). ECM and ESM are many: 2 ESM MR-410 or MP-405; 2 ECM MRP-11M or 12M ('Bell Shroud'), 2 'Bell Squat', 4 'Football B' and one MR-407; 2 PK-2M rocket launchers (140 mm), and 8 PK-10 (120 mm), 2–8 laser warning receiver systems Spektr-F, one Squeeze Box (TV, laser and IR system).

Sonar
Medium and high frequencies (M/HF) MGK-355 Platina integrated sonar system with NATO reporting name Bull Horn, including the MG-335 hull-mounted array. Type 956 originally only carries the hull-mounted array because the ASW gear of this class is primarily for self-defence. For Type 956A, an improved MGK-355MS Platina is carried, which includes hull-mounted array, VDS, and towed array, with NATO reporting names Bull Nose / Mare Tail / Steer Hide respectively. It is reported that Type 956EM is equipped with the successor of MGK-355/355MS, the MGK-355TA integrated sonar system, which includes both the hull-mounted and towed arrays (with NATO reporting name Horse Jaw & Horse Tail respectively).

Propulsion
The ship's propulsion system is based on two steam turbine engines each producing  together with four high-pressure boilers. There are two fixed-pitch propellers. The ship's maximum speed is just under . Several ships of this class suffered from problems regarding their propulsion system that were so severe that they had to be retired.

PLAN variants
The Chinese People's Liberation Army Navy Surface Force (PLAN) had two modified Sovremenny-class destroyers delivered in December 1999 and November 2000, designated as Project 956E, with improved electronic gears. In 2002, the PLAN ordered two improved versions designated Project 956EM. The first vessel was launched in late 2005, while the second was launched in 2006. All four vessels were commissioned to the East Sea Fleet.

On the improved Project Project 956EM, the aft AK-130 main gun was removed. The four AK-630 CIWS were replaced by two sets of Kashtan CIWS short-range air defence gun/missile systems. Each Kashtan system comprises a 3R86E1 command module and two 3R87E combat modules. Each 3R87E combat module has two 30 mm GSh-30k six-barrel automatic guns (range ) and two SA-N-11 air defence missiles. The air defense software is upgraded to accommodate the newer SA-N-12/SA-17 SAM system, but since China had already joined Russia in developing an even newer successor, it is not clear if SA-N-12/SA-17 has entered Chinese service in large numbers.

In 2006, the extra spheres (painted white in the mid-2006) added atop of the superstructures of the Chinese ships appearing in the latest photographs of the Chinese units have shown that these Chinese ships had been upgraded with the domestic HN-900 Data link (the Chinese equivalent of Link 11A/B, to be upgraded) and SATCOM (probably the SNTI-240).

From mid-2014, all four Chinese Sovremenny-class destroyers are planned to undergo a midlife upgrade program. As of 2016, Hangzhou was reported to be undergoing refit with its original components replaced with domestic systems. In addition to the replacement of electronics and sensors, armament upgrades include replacing 2x4 3M80E Moskit anti-ship missiles with 2x4 YJ-12A supersonic missiles and swapping two launchers for 48 SA-N-12 SAMs with 4 sets of 8-cell vertical launch systems totaling 32 cells for HQ-16C or Yu-8 anti-submarine missiles.

Project cost: 600 million US$ (mid-1990s price) was the price paid for Project 956A (two ships), and 1.4 billion US$ (early-2000s price) for Project 956EM (two ships).

Ships

See also
List of naval ship classes in service
List of active Russian Navy ships
List of ships of Russia by project number

References

External links

956 Sovremenny @ Encyclopedia of Ships 
Sovremenny @ home19.inet.tele.dk
All Russian Sovremenny Class Destroyers – Complete Ship List @ Russianships.info
Project 956 (Sovremenny) @ Forecast International

 
Destroyer classes
Ships of the People's Liberation Army Navy